Thomas Banks, D.D. was Dean of St Asaph from 18 December 1587 until his death on 31 July 1634.

Banks was educated at Christ's College, Cambridge. He held livings at Caerwys, Pennant, Llansantffraid and Llandrillo.

References 

16th-century Welsh Anglican priests
17th-century Welsh Anglican priests
Deans of St Asaph
1634 deaths
Alumni of Christ's College, Cambridge
Year of birth missing